{{DISPLAYTITLE:Nu3 Canis Majoris}}

Nu3 Canis Majoris, Latinized from ν3 Canis Majoris, is a binary star system in the southern constellation of Canis Major.

Characteristics
The star system, appearing as one star, is deemed visible to the naked eye with its combined apparent visual magnitude of 4.41. Based upon an annual parallax shift of 7.74 mas as seen from Earth, this system is about 420 light years from the Sun, much further than Nu1 and Nu2 which appear nearby when seen from one point in the Solar System.

The primary member, component A, is an evolved, orange-hued giant/bright giant hybrid with an apparent magnitude of +4.63 and a stellar classification of K0 II-III. It is most likely (96% chance) on the horizontal branch.

This giant has an estimated 3.4 times the mass of the Sun and has expanded to 33 times the Sun's radius. It is radiating 398 times the Sun's luminosity from its enlarged photosphere at an effective temperature of 4,510 K. The star is spinning with the leisurely period of 183 days. Its companion, component B has been observed at 1.040 arcseconds distant and has an apparent magnitude of +8.56.

References

K-type bright giants
Binary stars
Canis Majoris, Nu3
Canis Major
Durchmusterung objects
Canis Majoris, 08
047442
031700
2443